Delika canyon is a karst canyon of Spain, located in the province of Álava. It is formed by the Nervión river near the village of Delika. The Salto de Nervión, a intermittent  waterfall that is the highest in Spain [], flows from the canyon.

References 

Valleys of Spain
Geography of Álava
Landforms of the Basque Country (autonomous community)